Pedavi Datani Matokatundhi (English: I Have a word which I haven't Told Yet) is an Indian Telugu language, fantasy romantic comedy film directed by T Guru Prasad, written by TG Keerthi Kumar and produced by Aditi and TG Keerthi Kumar. It features Raavan Reddy and Payal Wadhwa and Naresh in the lead roles. The film was released on 27 July 2018.

Plot
Tarun is a stud and a famous musician during high school days, but arrogant and rude to his classmates except to his best friend, Abhay (Moin). He rejects and insults love proposals of many girls, including Ahaana's (Payal Wadhwa). Sai (Maurice Sadiche), another classmate of his, seeks to join Tarun's music band but gets bullied by Tarun and Abhay in front of the class. Few years later, Tarun is a college dropout and works as Janitor with Abhay as an accountant, both in the same company with Sai, as their boss. Sai constantly insults Tarun at the workplace, to take revenge of the embarrassing high school incident. Tarun falls in love with same Ahaana, the girl who he rejected and insulted during school days. Ahaana is now a beautiful, independent girl who refuses to forgive Tarun for what he did to her. Tarun claims himself to be a loser with all the problems. His father (V.K.Naresh), who works in a CCTV agency, constantly scolds him and motivates him at the same time. One day, Tarun accidentally falls into a cupid curse. He has to complete a task of matching three couples within 48 hours or he can never tell Ahaana that he loves her or for that matter, get any kind of love life again. Tarun is on chase to complete the task and save himself from the curse, with the help of his cupid associate Bunty (Nandu Kumar). He manages to complete the task, comes out of the curse and makes Ahaana fall in love with him.

Cast
 Raavan Reddy as Tarun
 Payal Wadhwa as Ahaana
 Naresh
 Moin Khan as Abhay
 Nandu Kumar as Bunty
 Priyanka Shukla as Consultant
 Maurice Sadiche as Sai
 Mohan Bagath as Vikky
 Govinda Raju as Tuition Master
 Shubh Saini as Anand
 Mahesh Mani as Janitor Student 1
 Aanand Sagare as Janitor Student 2
 Nandan as Janitor Student 3
 Surya Eswar as Janitor Student 4

Soundtrack
This film has five songs composed by Zenith Reddy and lyrics are written by Rahman. Music released on Lahari Music.

References

2018 films
2010s Telugu-language films

External links
 

2018 romantic comedy-drama films
Indian romantic comedy-drama films
Films shot in Bangalore
Films shot in Hyderabad, India